Ferreux-Quincey is a commune in the Aube department in north-central France. It was the site of the Benedictine Abbey of the Paraclete.

Population

See also
Communes of the Aube department

References

Communes of Aube
Aube communes articles needing translation from French Wikipedia